Zion Cohen (born March 7, 1983) is an Israeli football (soccer) striker who last played for Maccabi Tel Aviv.

The 22-year-old striker came from Hapoel Ashkelon, following Hapoel Rishon LeZion F.C., scored 15 goals in Ashkelon and promoted the team together with Carlos Chacana to the second league.

In July 2005, Cohen was found to have a genetic spleen problem, which caused him to resign from soccer.

References

1983 births
Israeli Jews
Living people
Israeli footballers
Hapoel Ashkelon F.C. players
Hapoel Rishon LeZion F.C. players
Israeli Premier League players
Liga Leumit players
Footballers from Ashkelon
Association football forwards